The 1977 Greenlandic Men's Football Championship was the 7th edition of the Greenlandic Men's Football Championship. The final round was held in Sisimiut. It was won by Nagdlunguaq-48.

See also
Football in Greenland
Football Association of Greenland
Greenland national football team
Greenlandic Men's Football Championship

References

Greenlandic Men's Football Championship seasons
Green
Green
Foot